This is a list of notable hostage crises by date.

References

+
Hostage crises